The Fairey P.12 Prince was a British experimental 700 hp (520 kW) class V-12 aircraft engine designed and built by Fairey in the early 1930s. The engine did not go into production.

Design and development
The Prince was a privately funded project designed by Captain A.G. Forsyth, who had joined the Fairey company in 1931 as their chief engine designer. The company had hoped to obtain Air Ministry orders for the engine but faced opposition, with the ministry favouring Bristol and Rolls-Royce engines instead.

Three prototypes were built in secrecy; with the engines running by 1933, a single Prince was installed and test flown in a Fairey Fox II biplane in 1934, but no orders materialised.

Applications
Fairey Fox

Variants
P.12 Prince I or Prince V-12
650 hp (485 kW) - Unsupercharged
P.12 Prince II or Super Prince V-12S
720 hp (537 kW) projected - Fully supercharged

Specifications (Prince I)

See also

References

Notes

Bibliography

 Gunston, Bill. World Encyclopedia of Aero Engines. Cambridge, England. Patrick Stephens Limited, 1989. 
 Lumsden, Alec. British Piston Engines and their Aircraft. Marlborough, Wiltshire: Airlife Publishing, 2003. .

External links
Flightglobal archive - Image of Prince installed in a Fairey Fox

Prince (V12)
1930s aircraft piston engines